The Australian women's cricket team toured the West Indies in May 1976. They played the West Indies women's cricket team in two Test matches, which were both drawn. The matches were the first ever played by a combined West Indies women's team.

Squads

Tour matches

1-day single innings match: Jamaica v Australia

Test Series

1st Test

2nd Test

References

External links
Australia Women tour of West Indies 1975/76 from Cricinfo

Women's international cricket tours of the West Indies
Australia women's national cricket team tours
1976 in West Indian cricket